The 2010 BWF World Junior Championships were held in Guadalajara, Mexico from April 16 to 25, 2010.

Medalists

Team competition
A total of 24 countries competed at the team competition in 2010 BWF World Junior Championships.

Final positions

Final round

Individual competitions

Boys Singles

Seeded

  Huang Yuxiang (quarter-final)
  Loh Wei Sheng (third round)
  Zulfadli Zulkiffli (fourth round)
  Pisit Poodchalat (quarter-final)
  Cai Ruiqing (second round)
  Viktor Axelsen (champion)
  Kasper Lehikoinen (second round)
  Sai Praneeth (semi-final)
  Kento Horiuchi (fourth round)
  Kim Min-Ki (third round)
  Lucas Claerbout (fourth round)
  Riyanto Subagja (quarter-final)
  Flemming Quach (third round)
  Toby Penty (second round)
  Liu Kai (quarter-final)
  Hsieh Feng-Tse (fourth round)

Finals

Top half

Section 1

Section 2

Section 3

Section 4

Bottom half

Section 5

Section 6

Section 7

Section 8

Girls Singles

Seeded

  Ratchanok Intanon (champion)
  Suo Di (semi-final)
  Deng Xuan (fourth round)
  Sapsiree Taerattanachai (fourth round)
  Choi Hye-In (third round)
  Sonia Cheah Su Ya (quarter-final)
  Fabienne Deprez (quarter-final)
  Tai Tzu-Ying (fourth round)
  Chiang Mei-Hui (second round)
  Misaki Matsutomo (final)
  Nittayaporn Nipatsant (third round)
  Jiang Yujing (fourth round)
  Wang Liang (fourth round)
  Sarah Milne (third round)
  Carolina Marin (quarter-final)
  Lea Palermo (second round)

Finals

Top half

Section 1

Section 2

Section 3

Section 4

Bottom half

Section 5

Section 6

Section 7

Section 8

Boys Doubles

Seeded

  Choi Seung-Il / Kang Ji-Wook (quarter-final)
  'Ow Yao Han / Yew Hong Kheng (champion)
  Nelson Heg Wei Keat / Teo Ee Yi (final)
  Jones Rafli Jansen / Dandi Prabudita (third round)
  Li Gen / Song Ziwei (third round)
  Chris Coles / Matthew Nottingham (quarter-final)
  Fabian Holzer / Max Schwenger (quarter-final)
  Sai Praneeth / Pranav Chopra (quarter-final)

Finals

Section 1

Section 2

Section 3

Section 4

Girls Doubles

Seeded

  Tang Jinhua / Xia Huan (final)
  Bao Yixin / Ou Dongni (champion)
  Sonia Cheah Su Ya / Yang Li Lian (second round)
  Choi Hye-In / Lee So-Hee (semi-final)
  Lai Pei Jing / Lai Shevon Jemie (third round)
  Gauri Ghate / Prajakta Sawant (second round)
  Ayumi Mine / Kurumi Yonao (quarter-final)
  Fabienne Deprez / Isabel Herttrich (quarter-final)

Finals

Section 1

Section 2

Section 3

Section 4

Mixed doubles

Seeded

  Liu Cheng / Bao Yixin (champion)
  Ow Yao Han / Lai Pei Jing (semi-final)
  Song Ziwei / Tang Jinhua (fourth round)
  Li Gen / Xia Huan (third round)
  Chen Zhuofu / Ou Dongni (quarter-final)
  Pranav Chopra / Prajakta Sawant (fourth round)
  Choi Seung-Il / Park So-Young (fourth round)
  Shohei Hoshino / Naoko Fukuman (quarter-final)
  Kim Astrup / Line Kjaersfeldt (quarter-final)
  Mario Cuba / Katherine Winder (fourth round)
  Denis Grachev / Anastasia Chervaykova (third round)
  Chris Coles / Jessica Fletcher (second round)
  Matthew Nottingham / Helena Lewczynska (fourth round)
  Lucas Corvee / Audrey Fontaine (second round)
  Max Schwenger / Isabel Herttrich (semi-final)
  Jones Rafli Jansen / Nurbeta Kwanrico (second round)

Finals

Top half

Section 1

Section 2

Section 3

Section 4

Bottom half

Section 5

Section 6

Section 7

Section 8

Medal table

References

External links
World Juniors Team Championship 2010 at Tournamentsoftware.com
World Junior Championship 2010 at Tournamentsoftware.com

2010
World Junior Championships
International sports competitions hosted by Mexico
2010 in Mexican sports
2010 in youth sport
Badminton tournaments in Mexico